"Way 2 Fonky" is the second single released off DJ Quik's second studio album, Way 2 Fonky.

Background and release
On the song, Quik takes time to address issues with MC Eiht and Bronx-based rapper, Tim Dog, who had released a song called "Fuck Compton". He claimed that he was growing tired of the increasing popularity of West Coast music that was causing him and other East Coast acts to be overlooked by record labels and publications alike. The song contains samples of "More Bounce to the Ounce" by Roger Troutman and "Falstaff" by The Watts Prophets. Tim Dog responded with "I Don't Give a Fuck" and "Breakin North" off his second album Do or Die. MC Eiht and Compton's Most Wanted responded with "Def Wish II", "Duck Sick II" and "Dead Men Tell No Lies" on their third album Music to Driveby.

Music video
The video featured Quik dressed in all black, surrounded by his homies in a dark warehouse setting that becomes illuminated by random flashes of light.

Track listings
CD single
"Way 2 Fonky" – 3:18

Vinyl, 12", Promo
"Way 2 Fonky" (Album Version) – 3:20
"Way 2 Fonky" (Radio Version) – 3:20
"Way 2 Fonky" (Instrumental) – 3:18
"Way 2 Fonky" (Acapella) – 0:50
"Mo' Pussy" (Album Version) – 3:40
"Mo' Pussy" (Instrumental) – 3:38

Chart performance

References

1992 singles
DJ Quik songs
Song recordings produced by DJ Quik
Songs written by DJ Quik
1992 songs